The Gold Coast bid for the 2018 Commonwealth Games was a successful bid to host the 2018 Commonwealth Games by the city of Gold Coast, Queensland, Australia. It beat the Hambantota bid for the 2018 Commonwealth Games to host the games, which will be held over 11 days, with the opening ceremony on 4 April 2018, and the last day of competition and closing ceremony on 15 April 2018.

Background 
On 22 August 2008, the Premier of Queensland, Anna Bligh, officially launched the Gold Coast's bid to host the Commonwealth Games in 2018. Ron Clarke, a medallist at both Commonwealth and Olympic Games and present Mayor of the Gold Coast, is expected to take a key role in promoting the bid.

On 7 April 2009, the ABC reported a land exchange deal between the City of Gold Coast and State of Queensland for Carrara Stadium. According to Mayor Ron Clarke the land will aid a potential bid for the 2018 Commonwealth Games. The land exchanged would be used as the site of an aquatics centre. In the same article Mayor Clarke raised the question of the Australian Federal Government's commitment to a 2018 Commonwealth Games Bid in light of the Government's support for Australia's 2018 FIFA World Cup Finals bid.

On 16 April 2009, Queensland Premier Anna Bligh told reporters that a successful Commonwealth Games bid by the Gold Coast could help the tourist strip win a role in hosting the World Cup. "Some of the infrastructure that would be built for the Commonwealth Games will be useful for the Gold Coast to get a World Cup game out of the soccer World Cup if we're successful as a nation," she said. However the decision on the 2018 and 2022 FIFA World Cups will come 11 months prior to the bid decision for the 2018 Commonwealth Games, so the potential World Cup venues will already have been chosen.

On 3 June 2009, the Gold Coast was confirmed as Australia's exclusive bidder vying for the 2018 Commonwealth Games. "Should a bid proceed, the Gold Coast will have the exclusive Australian rights to bid as host city for 2018," Premier Anna Bligh stated. "Recently I met with the president and CEO of the Australian Commonwealth Games Association and we agreed to commission a full and comprehensive feasibility study into the potential for the 2018 Commonwealth Games," she said. "Under the stewardship of Queensland Events new chair, Mr Geoff Dixon, that study is now well advanced."

On 15 March 2010, it was announced that the Queensland Government will provide initial funding of A$11 million for the 2018 Commonwealth Games bid. The Premier of Queensland has indicated the Government's support for the bid to the Australian Commonwealth Games Association.

On 31 March 2010, the Australian Commonwealth Games Association officially launched the bid to host the 2018 Commonwealth Games. In October 2011, Gold Coast Mayor Ron Clarke stated that the games would provide a strong legacy for the city after the games have ended.

Venues

See also 
Commonwealth Games celebrated in Australia
 2006 Commonwealth Games in Melbourne
 1982 Commonwealth Games in Brisbane
 1962 Commonwealth Games in Perth
 1938 Commonwealth Games in Sydney

References

External links   
 Gold Coast 2018 Bid website
 
 
 Gold Coast 2018 Block Plans

2018 Commonwealth Games bids
Australia at the Commonwealth Games
Sport on the Gold Coast, Queensland